Complete Greatest Hits or The Definitive, as it is known outside the US, is a 2002 compilation album by the British-American hard rock band Foreigner. Both Complete Greatest Hits and The Definitive have 20 tracks but The Definitive has a completely different track order and some different songs to better suit the International market.

The Definitive should not be confused with The Definitive Collection, a double-disc compilation album released by Foreigner in 2006.

The liner notes are unclear as to whether the included versions are singles or album cuts. Some track lengths differ from those listed under individual Wiki entries and so may be edits of those songs.

Track listing

Charts

Certifications

References

2002 greatest hits albums
Foreigner (band) albums
Atlantic Records compilation albums
Rhino Records compilation albums